The following shows a list of records held by certain players and teams in the Women's National Basketball League (WNBL).  All statistics are as of 12 January, 2017.

Individual

Points

Most points, career

Highest points per game average, career

Most points, season

Highest points per game average, season

Rebounds

Most rebounds, career

Highest rebounds per game average, career

Most rebounds, season

Highest rebounds per game average, season

Assists

Most assists, career

Highest assists per game average, career

Most assists, season

Highest assists per game average, season

Steals

Most steals, career

Highest steals per game average, career

Most steals, season

Highest steals per game average, season

Blocks

Most blocks, career

Highest blocks per game average, career

Most blocks, season

Highest blocks per game average, season

See also
 WNBL Statistical Leaders
 List of WNBL awards
 List of foreign WNBL players

External links
 2016-17 WNBL Media Guide
 WNBL Season-by-Season Guide

References

Records
Australian records
Basketball statistics